Black is a 2008 French blaxploitation film directed by Pierre Laffargue.

Synopsis

Black, a Frenchman with African roots, commits in France a heist with some complices. The early arrival of alarmed police kindles a shooting. Black's complices are killed and he can only scarcely escape by jumping from a bridge onto a running train. When he is all alone in his hideout, he receives a long-distance call from a cousin in Africa. Black is asked to rob diamonds from a bank. His cousin makes him believe this was easily done.

Black travels consequently to Africa. Once there, he has to realise that the responsible Africans he intends to rob are more sophisticated than he had thought. Moreover, a group of Russian soldiers of fortune also wants to steal the diamonds. Black outsmarts them and retrieves the diamonds during their holdup. Unfortunately his cousin tries to betray him. That is his cousin's downfall.

Now all on his own, Black is caught by a feisty female police agent. Soon both are hunted by vengeful former Russian commandos. While trying to elude, they get entangled in a local mystic prophecy and their struggle is lifted to a higher, supernatural level.

Cast
 MC Jean Gab'1 as Black 
 Carole Karemera as Pamela 
 François Levantal as Degrand  
 Mata Gabin as Fatoumata
 Anton Yakovlev as Ouliakov 
 Christophe Aquillon

Festivals
 Festival du film d'Avignon 2008
 SXSW Film Festival - Fantastic Fest at Midnight 2009
 Seattle International Film Festival 2009
 Fantasia 2009
 Film 4 FRIGHT FEST at London 2009
 Toronto After Dark Film Festival 2009
 Fresh Film Fest 2009 (Karlovy Vary, Czech Republic)

International Release
 Canada : Montreal: July 31, 2009 / Quebec & Sherbrooke: August, 2009
 Canada in DVD on October 6, 2009

References

External links
 

 French Producer : Chic Film
 Canadian Distributor : Evokative Films
 
 Pictures

2008 films
French exploitation films
Films set in Senegal
Hood films